Centofanti is an Italian surname. Notable people with the surname include:

Felice Centofanti (born 1969), Italian footballer
Martina Centofanti (born 1998), Italian rhythmic gymnast
Silvestro Centofanti (1794–1880), Italian politician

Italian-language surnames
it:Centofanti